Events from the year 2007 in Indonesia

Incumbents

Events

January
 January 1 – Adam Air Flight 574 disappears over Makassar Strait, Indonesia.
 January 1 – A speed boat capsized in the coastal area of Java Sea, Central Kalimantan. Fifteen people were killed in this accident.  
 January 1 – Whirlwind and landslides hit Lampung.
 January 2 – Floods inundated 107 houses in Sambas, West Kalimantan.
 January 2 – Strong whirlwind hit Bali and Nusa Tenggara, One person was killed, and one temple and three houses were damaged.
 January 3 – Four-meter high ocean waves destroyed 65 houses in the southern coast of Huangobotu village, Gorontalo.
 January 7 – New mudflow eruption was detected in Kedung Cangkring, Jabon, Sidoarjo, approx. 1.5 km from the first eruption.
 January 9 – Bakri, a local fisherman, found a piece of the tail of the Adam Air's missing Boeing 737 in Makassar Strait, 8 km south of Pare Pare, and about 300 m from the shore. The debris is right tail horizontal stabilizer, Tag Number 65C25746-76.
 January 11 – Following the discovery of the right tail horizontal stabilizer, a life vest and some parts of airline seats had also been found in Pare pare. 
 January 12 – Landslide hit the island of Sangihe, North Sulawesi and killed at least 16 people.
 January 13 – President Susilo Bambang Yudhoyono attend the ASEAN Summit in the Philippines.
 January 16 – Indonesian passenger train derailment killed at least five and injured more than a hundred people. The train derailed when passing a bridge in Banyumas, Central Java about 11 km west of Purwokerto, Central Java.
 January 21 – A earthquake measuring 7.5  struck near Sulawesi. The intensity VI (Strong) shock left several people dead and some buildings damaged.

See also
 History of Indonesia

References

 
Indonesia
Years of the 21st century in Indonesia
2000s in Indonesia
Indonesia